Diana Fram Edulji (born  26 January 1956) is a former Indian Test cricketer. Born in Mumbai to a Parsi family, she was drawn to sports at an early age. She grew up playing cricket with a tennis ball in the railway colony where she lived. She then went on to play basketball and table tennis at the junior national level, before migrating to cricket. At a cricket camp hosted by former Test cricketer Lala Amarnath, she honed her skills. At that time women's cricket was becoming more popular in India. Diana then went on to play for the Railways and then the Indian national cricket team where she was a successful slow left-arm orthodox bowler. She played her first series in 1975. In 1978 she was made the captain of the team. She remains the third highest wicket taker in Tests. 

In 1986 Edulji was refused entry to the Lord's Pavilion while captaining India on their tour of England. She quipped that the MCC (Marylebone Cricket Club) should change its name to MCP ("male chauvinist pigs").

Edulji was the first bowler to take 100 Women's Test wickets, but some of these Tests were later deemed unofficial. As per the official records, she took 63 Women's Test wickets, which is the highest by an Indian player, and the third highest of all-time, after Mary Duggan and Betty Wilson. She holds the record for delivering the most balls by any woman cricketer in Women's test history (5098+). She finished with 120 international wickets, which is the highest by a women's cricketer at the time of her retirement.

Diana received India's then greatest sports honour award, the Arjuna Award in 1983. The Government of India awarded her the civilian honour of Padma Shri in 2002. In the same year, she was felicitated by Castrol for her contribution to Indian women's cricket. She was the first Indian women's cricketer to be awarded a benefit match. She was appointed in BCCI administration panel by the Supreme Court of India on 30th January 2017. She became the first woman to be appointed to the BCCI selection panel.

References

Notes

Further reading

External links
Diana Edulji
Cricinfo
Sportslibro

Recipients of the Arjuna Award
1956 births
Living people
Indian women cricketers
India women Test cricketers
India women One Day International cricketers
Railways women cricketers
Mumbai women cricketers
West Zone women cricketers
Cricketers from Mumbai
Indian cricket coaches
Indian women cricket captains
Sportswomen from Maharashtra
Recipients of the Padma Shri in sports
20th-century Indian women
20th-century Indian people

Parsees cricketers
Parsi people
Parsi people from Mumbai